The Fresh Breeze Simonini is a German paramotor, designed and produced by Fresh Breeze of Wedemark for powered paragliding. The aircraft is named for its Simonini 200cc powerplant.

Design and development
The aircraft was designed in the 1990s and features a paraglider-style high-wing, single-place accommodation and a single Simonini 200cc two-stroke engine in pusher configuration, with recoil starting. The fuel capacity is  standard, with  optional. As is the case with all paramotors, take-off and landing is accomplished by foot.

The Simonini fits into the company's line in between the Solo 210-powered Solo model and the Hirth F33-powered Fresh Breeze Monster.

Specifications (Simonini)

References

External links

1990s German ultralight aircraft
Single-engined pusher aircraft
Paramotors
Simonini